The 1988 Bucknell Bison football team was an American football team that represented Bucknell University during the 1988 NCAA Division I-AA football season. Bucknell tied for third in the Colonial League. 

In their third and final year under head coach George Landis, the Bison compiled a 3–7 record. Ed Foley, Chris Hackley and Steve Weiss were the team captains.

The Bison were outscored 323 to 229. Their 2–3 conference record placed Bucknell in a three-way tie for third (and for next-to-last) in the six-team Colonial League standings.

Bucknell played its home games at Memorial Stadium on the university campus in Lewisburg, Pennsylvania.

Schedule

References

Bucknell
Bucknell Bison football seasons
Bucknell Bison football